"What I'm After" is the second single released from the Lords of the Underground's second album, Keepers of the Funk. Produced by K-Def, with the group serving as co-producers, "What I'm After" was a minor hit on the rap charts, peaking at 32 on the chart. The song samples Trouble Funk's "Pump Me Up" and fellow New Jersey native Redman's "Tonight's da Night". The promotional music video was directed by Diane Martel, her second Lords of the Underground video after "Chief Rocka", and featured a cameo appearance by Redman.

Single track listing

A-Side
"What I'm After" (Rumble Mix)- 4:19  
"What I'm After" (TV Mix)- 4:19  
"What I'm After" (Accapella)- 4:04

B-Side
"What I'm After" (Extended DJ Mix)- 5:55  
"What I'm After" (Instrumental)- 4:19  
"What I'm After" (Beat Box Bonus Beats)- 2:21

Charts

1995 singles
Lords of the Underground songs
1995 songs
Capitol Records singles